Stephen Gerard O'Donnell (born 11 May 1992) is a Scottish professional footballer who plays as a right-back for Motherwell and the Scotland national team. He has previously played for Partick Thistle, Luton Town and Kilmarnock, and was capped once by the Scotland under-21 team in 2013.

Club career

Early career
A pupil at St Aidan's High School in Wishaw, O'Donnell began his career as a youth player with Wishaw Wycombe Wanderers and captained the Aberdeen under-17 team. He then joined Celtic, where he was part of the team that won the Scottish Youth Cup and under-19 league title in 2010–11.

Partick Thistle
O'Donnell was released by Celtic in 2011 and on 23 August 2011 signed for Partick Thistle on a one-year contract after impressing on trial. He went on to make his debut on 17 September as a substitute in a 4–0 win at home to Ayr United. In 2012–13, O'Donnell played in 38 matches as Partick Thistle won promotion to the Scottish Premiership and reached the final of the Scottish Challenge Cup. He was named in the PFA Scotland First Division Team of the Year as a result of his performances. 

On 27 January 2015, Championship club Blackpool upped an initial offer of £50,000 for O'Donnell to £125,000. This offer was accepted by Partick Thistle, however, O'Donnell rejected the personal terms on offer at Blackpool in favour of seeing the remaining six months of his contract. He left Partick Thistle upon the expiry of his contract at the end of the 2014–15 season, having made 139 appearances for the club.

Luton Town
On 22 June 2015, O'Donnell signed a two-year contract with League Two club Luton Town. He made his Luton debut in a 3–1 win at home to newly promoted Championship club Bristol City in the League Cup on 11 August. O'Donnell's first goal for the club was a 90th-minute winner in a 2–1 win at home to Leyton Orient in the Football League Trophy on 1 September. He finished the 2015–16 season with 33 appearances and one goal. O'Donnell netted his second Luton goal in 2016–17 from a 25-yard shot in a 1–1 draw at home to Yeovil Town on 13 August 2016.

However, a loss of form saw O'Donnell lose his place in the team to academy graduate James Justin after a 2–0 defeat away to Crawley Town on 17 September. He regained his place in the team to make his first league start in five matches after Justin suffered a calf injury in the warm up before Luton's 2–1 win away to Leyton Orient on 15 October. O'Donnell lost his place once more when Justin returned from injury for Luton's 3–1 win away to Exeter City in the FA Cup on 5 November, but a half-time substitute appearance in the next round at home to National League club Solihull Moors on 3 December saw him score twice as Luton overturned a 2–0 deficit to win 6–2. He was then recalled to the starting lineup by manager Nathan Jones for the subsequent league match at home to Carlisle United, which resulted in a 1–1 draw. O'Donnell was released when his contract expired at the end of 2016–17.

Kilmarnock
O'Donnell signed a three-year contract with Scottish Premiership club Kilmarnock on 4 July 2017. O'Donnell performed well following the appointment of Steve Clarke as Kilmarnock manager, and he was selected for the Scotland squad in May 2018. Kilmarnock offered O'Donnell a new three-year contract in August 2019, but he opted to evaluate his contract situation at the end of the season. During January 2020 Oxford United made an offer for O'Donnell, but a deal was not completed before the closure of the transfer window. He rejected a new contract with Kilmarnock at the end of the 2019–20 season.

Motherwell
On 13 August 2020, Motherwell announced the signing of O'Donnell on a contract until the next transfer window. On 1 February 2021, he agreed a new contract with Motherwell until the end of the season. On 13 April 2021, O'Donnell signed a new two-year contract with Motherwell, keeping him at the club until the summer of 2023.

International career
O'Donnell made one appearance for the Scotland under-21 team in February 2013. He received his first call-up to the Scotland national team in May 2018, for friendly matches against Peru and Mexico. O'Donnell made his full Scotland debut on 29 May 2018, in a 2–0 defeat to Peru. He retained his place in the squad for the matches in September 2018, and "excelled" in the 2–0 win against Albania on 10 September.

O'Donnell was selected in the Scotland squad for UEFA Euro 2020 and played in all three of their matches at the tournament. His performance in the opening game against the Czech Republic was criticised, but was then praised after the goalless draw against England in the second match. In September 2021 he gained his 23rd cap overall and 12th as a Motherwell player in a 1–0 away win over Austria during 2022 FIFA World Cup qualification; as well as being praised for aspects of his performance against the highly regarded David Alaba, he also equalled a long-standing Motherwell club caps record set by George Stevenson in the 1930s.

Career statistics

Club

International

Honours
Partick Thistle
Scottish First Division: 2012–13
Scottish Challenge Cup runner-up: 2012–13

Individual
PFA Scotland Team of the Year: 2012–13 Scottish First Division

References

External links

1992 births
Living people
Footballers from Bellshill
Scottish footballers
Scotland under-21 international footballers
Scotland international footballers
Association football fullbacks
Association football utility players
Aberdeen F.C. players
Celtic F.C. players
Partick Thistle F.C. players
Luton Town F.C. players
Kilmarnock F.C. players
Motherwell F.C. players
Scottish Football League players
Scottish Professional Football League players
English Football League players
UEFA Euro 2020 players